Lehigh Valley Exposed was an alternative weekly tabloid newspaper based in the Lehigh Valley in Pennsylvania, which is now defunct. It was available free across the Lehigh Valley in bars, restaurants, and boxes on street corners. The newspaper was founded by its parent company and daily newspaper, The Express-Times in Easton, Pennsylvania. The paper published features on local Lehigh Valley bars, concerts, and restaurants.

See also
Media in the Lehigh Valley

External links
Official site
Official MySpace page

Alternative weekly newspapers published in the United States
Mass media in Allentown, Pennsylvania
Defunct newspapers published in Pennsylvania
Northampton County, Pennsylvania